The Trautmann Mediation was an attempt by the German Ambassador to China, Oskar Trautmann, to broker a peace between Japanese Prime Minister Fumimaro Konoe and Chiang Kai-shek of the Chinese Nationalist government shortly after the Second Sino-Japanese War began. The mediation began in November 1937 and ended on January 16, 1938, with Konoe announcing its termination.

Background
Since the 1920s, Germany had had a close relationship with the government of the Republic of China, led by the Kuomintang. After the Nazi Party took power, Germany maintained its good relationship with the Chinese government but signed the Anti-Comintern Pact with Japan in November 1936. Germany's expectation for Japan was to be an eastern counterweight against the Soviet Union. For Germany, any armed conflict between China and Japan was very unwelcome.

After August 1937, the Battle of Shanghai had escalated into the full-scale war. China appealed to the international community including League of Nations, to take necessary measures against Japanese aggression.  

Japan did not want endless war with China and so made the peace proposal and asked Germany to mediate the peace talks in October 1937.

First proposal
The following is a summary of the first Japanese peace proposal, which was approved by Germany. Trautmann handed this proposal to the Chinese government on November 5, 1937.

 Autonomy for Inner Mongolia
 A de-militarized zone between Manchukuo and northern China under Nanking government administration
 A de-militarized zone in Shanghai with international police
 The cessation of all anti-Japan policies
 Cooperation between Japan and China against communism
 Lower tariffs for Japanese goods
 Respect foreign nation's properties and rights in China

Japan warned the proposal would be valid for only a limited time because a fierce battle still continued. However, Chiang Kai-shek expected diplomatic or military assistance from outside parties. Therefore, he deferred his government's reply to Tokyo. The Nine Power Treaty Conference began in Brussels, Belgium on November 3, 1937.

The conference issued a declaration on 15 November and concluded on November 24, having taken no effective measures. The League of Nations was also unable to take any effective measures.

During that time, Japan was gaining the upper hand militarily, with the end of the Battle of Shanghai on November 26. At the end of November, the military situation for China became hopeless. The fall of Nanking, the capital, was imminent. Therefore, Chiang Kai-shek decided to accept the Japanese proposal as the basis of peace negotiations, which was communicated to Trautmann on December 2, 1937.

However, the Japanese hardliners were gaining momentum in Tokyo after the bloody Battle of Shanghai. They thought the original proposal was too lenient and no longer a valid basis for peace talks. Japan officially refused the peace negotiation that was based on the first proposal and promised to offer another peace proposal within a few weeks.

Second proposal
After lengthy internal discussion, the Konoe cabinet made the second proposal as follows:

 Diplomatic recognition for Manchukuo
 Inner Mongolia autonomy
 Cessation of all anti-Japan and anti-Manchukuo policies
 Cooperation between Japan, Manchukuo and China against communism
 War reparations
 Demilitarized zones in North China and inner Mongolia
 Trade agreement between Japan, Manchukuo and China

A Japanese diplomat told it to the German ambassador in Japan on December 22, 1937. Japan also set January 5, 1938 as the deadline for a Chinese reply.

However, this new proposal was far beyond what was acceptable for Chiang Kai-shek. He refused it but did not make an official reply.

Termination
On January 11, 1938, six days after the deadline for a Chinese government reply, an Imperial Conference (Gozen Kaigi) was held at Tokyo. Japanese cabinet ministers and military leaders discussed how to handle the Trautmann mediation. The navy did not have a strong opinion because the current war was basically the army's business. The army requested to end the war with more lenient conditions by a diplomatic way, as it faced a much stronger Far Eastern Soviet army at the northern Manchukuo border and wanted to avoid endless attrition warfare. However, Kōki Hirota, the minister of foreign affairs, strongly disagreed with the army. According to him, there was no hope for the Trautmann mediation because of the huge opinion gap between China and Japan.

On January 15, 1938, Japanese primary cabinet members and military leaders had a conference. This time, the emperor did not attend. There was a heated argument about the continuation of the Trautmann mediation. Hayao Tada, Deputy Chief of Army General Staff, insisted on continuation. Konoe, Hirota, Navy Minister Mitsumasa Yonai and War Minister Hajime Sugiyama disagreed with him. Finally, Tada reluctantly agreed with Konoe and Hirota. That same day, Konoe reported the cabinet's conclusion, termination of Trautmann's mediation, to the emperor.

The next day, January 16, 1938, Konoe announced (first Konoe Declaration, 第一次近衛声明), "The Japanese government will not negotiate with the Chiang Kai-shek government anymore."

References

Sources
Tetsuya Kataoka, Resistance and Revolution in China: The Communists and the Second United Front,1974, University of California Press

20th century in China
20th century in Japan
1937 in China
1937 in Japan
1938 in China
1938 in Japan
Germany–Japan relations
China–Germany relations
Second Sino-Japanese War
Foreign relations of Nazi Germany